Darko Todorović (born 5 May 1997) is a Bosnian professional footballer who plays as a right-back for Russian Premier League club Akhmat Grozny and the Bosnia and Herzegovina national team.

Todorović started his professional career at Sloboda Tuzla, before joining Red Bull Salzburg in 2018. He was loaned to Holstein Kiel in 2019, to Hajduk Split in 2020 and to Akhmat Grozny in 2021. In 2022, he signed permanently with Akhmat Grozny.

A former youth international for Bosnia and Herzegovina, Todorović made his senior international debut in 2018, earning 16 caps since.

Club career

Early career
Todorović started playing football at a local club, before joining Sloboda Tuzla's youth academy. He made his professional debut against Zrinjski Mostar on 11 April 2015 at the age of 17. On 21 September 2016, he scored his first professional goal against Podrinje Janja, which sent his team through in their cup tie.

Red Bull Salzburg
In July 2018, Todorović was transferred to Austrian outfit Red Bull Salzburg for an undisclosed fee. He made his official debut for the side in Austrian Cup game on 22 July. Three weeks later, he made his league debut against Austria Wien. He won his first trophy with the club on 5 May 2019, when they were crowned league champions.

In July, Todorović was loaned to German team Holstein Kiel until the end of season.

In August 2020, he was sent on a season-long loan to Croatian outfit Hajduk Split.

Akhmat Grozny
In September 2021, Todorović was loaned to Russian side Akhmat Grozny for the remainder of campaign. He made his competitive debut for the team against Zenit St. Petersburg on 11 September.

In June 2022, Akhmat Grozny signed Todorović on a two-year deal.

International career
Todorović represented Bosnia and Herzegovina at all youth levels.

In January 2018, he received his first senior call-up, for friendly games against the United States and Mexico. He debuted against the former on 28 January.

Career statistics

Club

International

Honours
Red Bull Salzburg
Austrian Bundesliga: 2018–19
Austrian Cup: 2018–19

References

External links

1997 births
Living people
People from Bijeljina
Serbs of Bosnia and Herzegovina
Bosnia and Herzegovina footballers
Bosnia and Herzegovina youth international footballers
Bosnia and Herzegovina under-21 international footballers
Bosnia and Herzegovina international footballers
Bosnia and Herzegovina expatriate footballers
Association football fullbacks
FK Sloboda Tuzla players
FC Red Bull Salzburg players
Holstein Kiel players
HNK Hajduk Split players
FC Akhmat Grozny players
Premier League of Bosnia and Herzegovina players
Austrian Football Bundesliga players
2. Bundesliga players
Croatian Football League players
Russian Premier League players
Expatriate footballers in Austria
Expatriate footballers in Germany
Expatriate footballers in Croatia
Expatriate footballers in Russia
Bosnia and Herzegovina expatriate sportspeople in Austria
Bosnia and Herzegovina expatriate sportspeople in Germany
Bosnia and Herzegovina expatriate sportspeople in Croatia
Bosnia and Herzegovina expatriate sportspeople in Russia